Huangjia is a town under the administration of Laoling City in northwestern Shandong province, China, located about  south of the border with Hebei and  north-northwest of downtown Laoling. , it has 54 villages under its administration.

See also 
 List of township-level divisions of Shandong

References 

Township-level divisions of Shandong